Deena is a given name that is mainly feminine, but sometimes masculine.

Deena is a name of Hebrew origin, meaning 'valley'. It is a feminine name that is often used as a short form of the name Dinah. The name Deena is often associated with the biblical character Dinah, daughter of Jacob and Leah.

Some notables name Deena include:

Women:
 Deena Aljuhani Abdulaziz (born 1975), Saudi Arabian princess
 Deena Deardurff (born 1957), American retired swimmer
 Deena Dill, American actress and executive producer
 Deena Horst, American politician, member of the Kansas House of Representatives (1995–2010)
 Deena Kastor (born 1973), American long-distance runner
 Deena Brush Mapple (born 1960), American retired water skier
 Deena Mehta (born 1961), Indian businesswoman, first woman president of the Bombay Stock Exchange
 Deena M. Mistri (1925–2011), Pakistani educator
 Diane Deena Payne (born 1954), English actress
 Deena Weinstein (born 1943), American professor of sociology
 Deena (singer) (stage name of Deena Herr, a German singer performing in Uganda

Men:
 Deena Nath Singh Yadav ( Indian politician
 Deena Ram (born 1964), Indian male former steeplechase runner

Fictional characters
Deena Schuster, a character in 2012 American comedy film Wanderlust

See also
 Dena (given name)
 Dheena, an Indian film
 Dinah

References